Gaiam Vivendi Entertainment (formerly known as Vivendi Entertainment, Vivendi Visual Entertainment and Visual Entertainment) is an independent film, television, DVD and digital distribution company operating in the United States and Canada. It is also a distribution partner for independent content providers.

History
Visual Entertainment was founded in 2004 to distribute DVDs as a division of Universal Music Group Distribution, which in turn is a subsidiary of Vivendi. In 2006, Visual Entertainment was renamed Vivendi Visual Entertainment. In 2008, Vivendi Entertainment expanded from home video into theatrical distribution.

On April 3, 2012, Universal disvested Vivendi Entertainment because of the buyout of EMI, and the company was acquired by Gaiam and merged with its home entertainment division, renaming the combined subsidiary Gaiam Vivendi Entertainment. It was one of the three units of Universal Music, never fully owned by EMI, that were forced to be sold; other such units were Sanctuary Records and V2 Records. On October 17, 2013, Cinedigm announced it was purchasing Gaiam Vivendi Entertainment for $51.5 million. Cinedigm plans to combine Gaiam Vivendi Entertainment with their existing home video business, New Video. The acquisition closed on October 21, 2013.

Services
The company has provided sales, marketing, and distribution services to studios such as The Weinstein Company, World Wrestling Entertainment, The Jim Henson Company, Salient Media, NFL Films, Shout! Factory, GoodTimes Entertainment, Classic Media, Hallmark Channel, Indomina Releasing, Nasser Entertainment, Event Film, RHI Entertainment, Polychrome Pictures, Sid and Marty Krofft, Eagle Rock Entertainment, Blowtorch Entertainment, Mill Creek Entertainment, DHX Media, Saban Brands, Saban Entertainment, Palisades Tartan, Palm Pictures, Nelvana, Razor & Tie, Dargaud Media, Pure Flix Entertainment, Codeblack Entertainment, Melee Entertainment, Dimension Extreme and Genius Products.

The company has partnered with DHX Media by creating free episodes, "special collections", and "discounted seasons" for fans of the Inspector Gadget franchise in the US.

On September 10, 2013, the company released Secret Millionaires Club: Volume 2 on DVD.

References

2004 establishments in California
American companies established in 2004
Mass media companies established in 2004
Film distributors of the United States
Film production companies of the United States
Home video companies of the United States
Former Vivendi subsidiaries
Companies based in Los Angeles County, California
2012 mergers and acquisitions
2013 mergers and acquisitions
Universal City, California
Cinedigm